The A6079 is a road in Northumberland, northern England, that runs eight miles (13 km) from Hexham to the A68 road.

Route
The road begins in Hexham before overlapping the A69 for 0.7 miles, then passing the villages of Acomb and Wall prior to meeting the B6318 road just to the south of Chollerford – unusually, traffic on the A6079 must give way to the traffic on the B6318, despite the fact that "A"-roads are more important than "B"-roads. The A6079 continues through the village of Chollerton, and terminates at its junction with the A68 road to Edinburgh, nine miles (14 km) north-west of Corbridge.

References 

Roads in England
Transport in Northumberland
Roads in Northumberland